Mchedlishvili is a Georgian language occupational surname literally meaning "blacksmith's son", and may refer to:

 Davit Mchedlishvili (born 1988), Georgian footballer
 Mikheil Mchedlishvili (born 1979), Georgian chess grandmaster

Georgian-language surnames
Occupational surnames